This page lists all described species of the spider family Selenopidae accepted by the World Spider Catalog :

Amamanganops

Amamanganops Crews & Harvey, 2011
 A. baginawa Crews & Harvey, 2011 (type) — Philippines

Anyphops

Anyphops Benoit, 1968
 A. alticola (Lawrence, 1940) — South Africa
 A. amatolae (Lawrence, 1940) — South Africa
 A. atomarius (Simon, 1887) (type) — Southern Africa
 A. barbertonensis (Lawrence, 1940) — Somalia, South Africa
 A. barnardi (Lawrence, 1940) — Zimbabwe
 A. basutus (Pocock, 1901) — Lesotho
 A. bechuanicus (Lawrence, 1940) — Botswana
 A. benoiti Corronca, 1998 — Madagascar
 A. braunsi (Lawrence, 1940) — South Africa
 A. broomi (Pocock, 1900) — South Africa
 A. caledonicus (Lawrence, 1940) — South Africa
 A. capensis (Lawrence, 1940) — South Africa
 A. civicus (Lawrence, 1940) — South Africa
 A. decoratus (Lawrence, 1940) — South Africa
 A. dubiosus (Lawrence, 1952) — South Africa
 A. dulacen Corronca, 2000 — Namibia
 A. fitzsimonsi (Lawrence, 1940) — South Africa
 A. gilli (Lawrence, 1940) — South Africa
 A. helenae (Lawrence, 1940) — South Africa
 A. hessei (Lawrence, 1940) — South Africa
 A. hewitti (Lawrence, 1940) — South Africa
 A. immaculatus (Lawrence, 1940) — South Africa
 A. karrooicus (Lawrence, 1940) — South Africa
 A. kivuensis Benoit, 1968 — Congo
 A. kraussi (Pocock, 1898) — South Africa
 A. lawrencei (Roewer, 1951) — South Africa
 A. leleupi Benoit, 1972 — South Africa
 A. lesserti (Lawrence, 1940) — South Africa
 A. lignicola (Lawrence, 1937) — South Africa
 A. lochiel Corronca, 2000 — South Africa
 A. longipedatus (Roewer, 1955) — South Africa
 A. lucia Corronca, 2005 — South Africa
 A. lycosiformis (Lawrence, 1937) — South Africa
 A. maculosus (Lawrence, 1940) — South Africa
 A. marshalli (Pocock, 1902) — South Africa
 A. minor (Lawrence, 1940) — South Africa
 A. montanus (Lawrence, 1940) — South Africa
 A. mumai (Corronca, 1996) — South Africa
 A. namaquensis (Lawrence, 1940) — Namibia
 A. narcissi Benoit, 1972 — Eswatini
 A. natalensis (Lawrence, 1940) — South Africa
 A. ngome Corronca, 2005 — South Africa
 A. parvulus (Pocock, 1900) — Congo, South Africa
 A. phallus (Lawrence, 1952) — South Africa
 A. pococki (Lawrence, 1940) — South Africa
 A. purcelli (Lawrence, 1940) — South Africa
 A. regalis (Lawrence, 1940) — South Africa
 A. reservatus (Lawrence, 1937) — South Africa
 A. rubicundus (Lawrence, 1940) — South Africa
 A. schoenlandi (Pocock, 1902) — South Africa
 A. septemspinatus (Lawrence, 1937) — South Africa
 A. septentrionalis Benoit, 1975 — Cameroon
 A. sexspinatus (Lawrence, 1940) — Namibia
 A. silvicolellus (Strand, 1913) — Central Africa
 A. smithersi (Lawrence, 1940) — Lesotho
 A. spenceri (Pocock, 1896) — South Africa
 A. sponsae (Lessert, 1933) — Congo, Angola
 A. stauntoni (Pocock, 1902) — St. Helena, South Africa
 A. stridulans (Lawrence, 1940) — South Africa
 A. thornei (Lawrence, 1940) — South Africa
 A. transvaalicus (Lawrence, 1940) — South Africa
 A. tuckeri (Lawrence, 1940) — South Africa
 A. tugelanus (Lawrence, 1942) — South Africa
 A. whiteae (Pocock, 1902) — South Africa

Garcorops

Garcorops Corronca, 2003
 G. jocquei Corronca, 2003 — Comoros
 G. madagascar Corronca, 2003 (type) — Madagascar
 G. paulyi Corronca, 2003 — Madagascar
 † G. jadis Bosselaers, 2004  — Quaternary Madagascan copal

Godumops

Godumops Crews & Harvey, 2011
 G. caritus Crews & Harvey, 2011 (type) — New Guinea

Hovops

Hovops Benoit, 1968
 H. antakarana Rodríguez & Corronca, 2014 — Madagascar
 H. betsileo Corronca & Rodríguez, 2011 — Madagascar
 H. ikongo Rodríguez & Corronca, 2014 — Madagascar
 H. legrasi (Simon, 1887) — Madagascar
 H. lidiae Corronca & Rodríguez, 2011 — Madagascar
 H. madagascariensis (Vinson, 1863) — Madagascar
 H. mariensis (Strand, 1908) — Madagascar
 H. menabe Rodríguez & Corronca, 2014 — Madagascar
 H. merina Corronca & Rodríguez, 2011 — Madagascar
 H. pusillus (Simon, 1887) (type) — Madagascar
 H. vezo Rodríguez & Corronca, 2014 — Madagascar

Karaops

Karaops Crews & Harvey, 2011
 K. alanlongbottomi Crews & Harvey, 2011 — Australia (Western Australia)
 K. australiensis (L. Koch, 1875) — Australia (Queensland)
 K. badgeradda Crews & Harvey, 2011 — Australia (Western Australia)
 K. banyjima Crews, 2013 — Australia (Western Australia)
 K. burbidgei Crews & Harvey, 2011 — Australia (Western Australia)
 K. dawara Crews & Harvey, 2011 — Australia (Northern Territory)
 K. deserticola Crews & Harvey, 2011 — Australia (South Australia)
 K. ellenae Crews & Harvey, 2011 (type) — Australia (Western Australia)
 K. feedtime Crews, 2013 — Australia (Western Australia)
 K. forteyi Crews, 2013 — Australia (Western Australia)
 K. francesae Crews & Harvey, 2011 — Australia (Western Australia)
 K. gangarie Crews & Harvey, 2011 — Australia (Queensland)
 K. jaburrara Crews, 2013 — Australia (Western Australia)
 K. jarrit Crews & Harvey, 2011 — Australia (Western Australia)
 K. jenniferae Crews & Harvey, 2011 — Australia (Western Australia)
 K. julianneae Crews & Harvey, 2011 — Australia (Western Australia)
 K. kariyarra Crews, 2013 — Australia (Western Australia)
 K. karrawarla Crews & Harvey, 2011 — Australia (Western Australia)
 K. keithlongbottomi Crews & Harvey, 2011 — Australia (Western Australia)
 K. larryoo Crews & Harvey, 2011 — Australia (Western Australia)
 K. manaayn Crews & Harvey, 2011 — Australia (New South Wales)
 K. marrayagong Crews & Harvey, 2011 — Australia (New South Wales)
 K. martamarta Crews & Harvey, 2011 — Australia (Western Australia)
 K. monteithi Crews & Harvey, 2011 — Australia (Queensland)
 K. ngarluma Crews, 2013 — Australia (Western Australia)
 K. ngarutjaranya Crews & Harvey, 2011 — Australia (South Australia)
 K. nyamal Crews, 2013 — Australia (Western Australia)
 K. nyangumarta Crews, 2013 — Australia (Western Australia)
 K. nyiyaparli Crews, 2013 — Australia (Western Australia)
 K. pilkingtoni Crews & Harvey, 2011 — Australia (Northern Territory)
 K. raveni Crews & Harvey, 2011 — Australia (Queensland, New South Wales)
 K. toolbrunup Crews & Harvey, 2011 — Australia (Western Australia)
 K. umiida Crews, 2013 — Australia (Western Australia)
 K. vadlaadambara Crews & Harvey, 2011 — Australia (South Australia)
 K. yindjibarndi Crews, 2013 — Australia (Western Australia)
 K. yumbu Crews, 2013 — Australia (Western Australia)
 K. yurlburr Crews, 2013 — Australia (Western Australia)

Makdiops

Makdiops Crews & Harvey, 2011
 M. agumbensis (Tikader, 1969) — India
 M. mahishasura Crews & Harvey, 2011 — India
 M. montigena (Simon, 1889) (type) — India, Nepal
 M. nilgirensis (Reimoser, 1934) — India
 M. shevaroyensis (Gravely, 1931) — India
 M. shiva Crews & Harvey, 2011 — India

Selenops

Selenops Latreille, 1819
 S. ab Logunov & Jäger, 2015 — Vietnam
 S. abyssus Muma, 1953 — Mexico
 S. actophilus Chamberlin, 1924 — USA, Mexico
 S. aequalis Franganillo, 1935 — Cuba
 S. aissus Walckenaer, 1837 — USA, Bahama Is., Cuba
 S. alemani Muma, 1953 — Cuba
 S. amona Crews, 2011 — Puerto Rico
 S. anacaona Crews, 2018 — Hispaniola (Dominican Rep.)
 S. angelae Corronca, 1998 — Ecuador
 S. angolaensis Corronca, 2002 — Angola
 S. annulatus Simon, 1876 — Cameroon to Tanzania
 S. ansieae Corronca, 2002 — South Africa
 S. arikok Crews, 2011 — Colombia, Aruba
 S. aztecus Valdez-Mondragón, 2010 — Mexico
 S. bani Alayón, 1992 — Hispaniola
 S. banksi Muma, 1953 — Panama, Guyana, Peru
 S. bastet Zamani & Crews, 2019 — Egypt
 S. baweka Crews, 2011 — Turks & Caicos Is.
 S. bifurcatus Banks, 1909 — Guatemala to Costa Rica
 S. bocacanadensis Crews, 2011 — Hispaniola (Dominican Rep.)
 S. brachycephalus Lawrence, 1940 — Zimbabwe, South Africa
 S. bursarius Karsch, 1879 — China, Korea, Taiwan, Japan
 S. buscki Muma, 1953 — Panama
 S. cabagan Alayón, 2005 — Cuba
 S. camerun Corronca, 2001 — Cameroon
 S. canasta Alayón, 2005 — Cuba
 S. candidus Muma, 1953 — Jamaica
 S. caney Alayón, 2005 — Cuba
 S. caonabo Crews, 2018 — Hispaniola (Dominican Rep.)
 S. chamela Crews, 2011 — Mexico
 S. cocheleti Simon, 1880 — Panama to Argentina
 S. comorensis Schmidt & Krause, 1994 — Comoros
 S. cristis Corronca, 2002 — Ghana or Namibia
 S. curazao Alayón, 2001 — Bonaire, Curaçao
 S. debilis Banks, 1898 — USA, Mexico
 S. denia Crews, 2011 — Hispaniola
 S. dilamen Corronca, 2002 — Congo
 S. dilon Corronca, 2002 — South Africa
 S. duan Crews, 2011 — Hispaniola
 S. ducke Corronca, 1996 — Brazil
 S. dufouri Vinson, 1863 — Madagascar, Réunion
 S. ecuadorensis Berland, 1913 — Ecuador
 S. ef Jäger, 2019 — Cambodia
 S. enriquillo Crews, 2011 — Jamaica, Hispaniola
 S. feron Corronca, 2002 — South Africa
 S. florenciae Corronca, 2002 — Angola
 S. formosus Bryant, 1940 — Cuba
 S. geraldinae Corronca, 1996 — Brazil, Colombia, Venezuela, Trinidad
 S. gracilis Muma, 1953 — Mexico
 S. guerrero Crews, 2011 — Hispaniola
 S. hebraicus Mello-Leitão, 1945 — Brazil, Paraguay, Argentina
 S. huetocatl Crews, 2011 — Mexico
 S. iberia Alayón, 2005 — Cuba
 S. ilcuria Corronca, 2002 — Cameroon, South Africa
 S. imias Alayón, 2005 — Cuba
 S. insularis Keyserling, 1881 — USA, Greater Antilles
 S. intricatus Simon, 1910 — West, Central Africa
 S. isopodus Mello-Leitão, 1941 — Colombia
 S. ivohibe Corronca, 2005 — Madagascar
 S. ixchel Crews, 2011 — Mexico
 S. jocquei Corronca, 2005 — Ivory Coast
 S. juxtlahuaca Valdez, 2007 — Mexico
 S. kalinago Crews, 2011 — Lesser Antilles
 S. kikay Corronca, 1996 — Brazil
 S. kruegeri Lawrence, 1940 — Southern Africa
 S. lavillai Corronca, 1996 — Venezuela, Peru, Brazil
 S. lepidus Muma, 1953 — Mexico
 S. lesnei Lessert, 1936 — East, Southern Africa
 S. levii Corronca, 1997 — Brazil
 S. lindborgi Petrunkevitch, 1926 — Caribbean
 S. littoricola Strand, 1913 — Central Africa
 S. lobatse Corronca, 2001 — South Africa
 S. lucibel Corronca, 2002 — Southern Africa
 S. lumbo Corronca, 2001 — East Africa
 S. makimaki Crews, 2011 — Mexico
 S. malinalxochitl Crews, 2011 — Mexico
 S. manzanoae Corronca, 1997 — Brazil
 S. maranhensis Mello-Leitão, 1918 — Brazil, Bolivia, Paraguay, Argentina
 S. marcanoi Alayón, 1992 — Hispaniola
 S. marginalis F. O. Pickard-Cambridge, 1900 — Mexico
 S. marilus Corronca, 1998 — Venezuela
 S. melanurus Mello-Leitão, 1923 — Brazil
 S. mexicanus Keyserling, 1880 — USA to Colombia, Galapagos Is.
 S. micropalpus Muma, 1953 — Lesser Antilles (Martinique, Dominica, Saint Lucia, Saint Vincent and the Grenadines)
 S. minutus F. O. Pickard-Cambridge, 1900 — Guatemala
 S. morosus Banks, 1898 — Mexico
 S. morro Crews, 2011 — Hispaniola (Dominican Rep.)
 S. muehlmannorum Jäger & Praxaysombath, 2011 — Laos
 S. nesophilus Chamberlin, 1924 — USA, Mexico
 S. nigromaculatus Keyserling, 1880 — Mexico
 S. occultus Mello-Leitão, 1918 — Brazil, Paraguay, Argentina
 S. oculatus Pocock, 1898 — Yemen
 S. ollarius Zhu, Sha & Chen, 1990 — China
 S. onka Corronca, 2005 — Angola, Namibia
 S. oricuajo Crews, 2011 — Costa Rica
 S. ovambicus Lawrence, 1940 — West, East, Southern Africa
 S. oviedo Crews, 2011 — HIspaniola
 S. para Corronca, 1996 — Brazil
 S. pensilis Muma, 1953 — Hispaniola (Haiti, Dominican Rep.)
 S. peraltae Corronca, 1997 — Bolivia
 S. petenajtoy Crews, 2011 — Guatemala
 S. petrunkevitchi Alayón, 2003 — Jamaica
 S. phaselus Muma, 1953 — Hispaniola
 S. pygmaeus Benoit, 1975 — Ivory Coast, Congo
 S. radiatus Latreille, 1819 (type) — Mediterranean, Africa, Middle East, India, Myanmar, China
 S. rapax Mello-Leitão, 1929 — Brazil, Argentina
 S. rosario Alayón, 2005 — Cuba
 S. sabulosus Benoit, 1968 — Djibouti
 S. saldali Corronca, 2002 — Ghana, Nigeria
 S. scitus Muma, 1953 — Mexico
 S. secretus Hirst, 1911 — Seychelles
 S. siboney Alayón, 2005 — Cuba
 S. simius Muma, 1953 — Bahama Is., Cuba, Cayman Is.
 S. souliga Crews, 2011 — Lesser Antilles (Anguilla, Saint-Martin, Sint Maarten, Saint Barthélemy)
 S. spixi Perty, 1833 — Brazil, Uruguay, Argentina
 S. submaculosus Bryant, 1940 — USA, Bahamas, Cuba, Cayman Is.
 S. tenebrosus Lawrence, 1940 — Zimbabwe, South Africa
 S. tiky Corronca, 1998 — Venezuela
 S. tomsici Corronca, 1996 — Peru
 S. tonteldoos Corronca, 2005 — South Africa
 S. trifidus Bryant, 1948 — Caribbean (Navassa Is.)
 S. vigilans Pocock, 1898 — West, Central, East Africa, Madagascar
 S. vinalesi Muma, 1953 — Cuba
 S. viron Corronca, 2002 — Kenya
 S. willinki Corronca, 1996 — Trinidad
 S. wilmotorum Crews, 2011 — Jamaica
 S. wilsoni Crews, 2011 — Jamaica
 S. ximenae Corronca, 1997 — Brazil
 S. zairensis Benoit, 1968 — Congo, Ivory Coast, Angola
 S. zuluanus Lawrence, 1940 — Zimbabwe, Botswana, South Africa
 S. zumac Corronca, 1996 — Brazil
 † S. benoiti Wunderlich, 2004 
 † S. beynai Schawaller, 1984 
 † S. dominicanus Wunderlich, 2004

Siamspinops

Siamspinops Dankittipakul & Corronca, 2009
 S. aculeatus (Simon, 1901) — Malaysia
 S. allospinosus Dankittipakul & Corronca, 2009 — Thailand
 S. formosensis (Kayashima, 1943) — Taiwan
 S. spinescens Dankittipakul & Corronca, 2009 — Malaysia
 S. spinosissimus Dankittipakul & Corronca, 2009 (type) — Thailand
 S. spinosus Dankittipakul & Corronca, 2009 — Thailand

References

Selenopidae